St Machar's Cathedral usually called Old Machar (Scottish Gaelic: Cathair-eaglais Naomh Machar), (or, more formally, the Cathedral Church of St Machar) is a Church of Scotland church in Aberdeen, Scotland. It is located to the north of the city centre, in the former burgh of Old Aberdeen. Technically, St Machar's is no longer a cathedral but rather a high kirk, as it has not been the seat of a bishop of the Catholic Church in Scotland or the Scottish Episcopal Church since 1690.

History 

St Machar is said to have been a companion of St Columba on his journey to Iona. A fourteenth-century legend tells how God (or St Columba) told Machar to establish a church where a river bends into the shape of a bishop's crosier before flowing into the sea. The River Don bends in this way just below where the cathedral now stands. According to legend, St Machar founded a site of worship in Old Aberdeen in about 580. Machar's church was superseded by a Norman cathedral in 1131, shortly after David I transferred the See from Mortlach to Aberdeen. Almost nothing of that original cathedral survives; a lozenge-decorated base for a capital supporting one of the architraves can be seen in the Charter Room in the present church.

After the execution of William Wallace in 1305, his body was cut up and sent to different corners of the country to warn other dissenters. His left quarter ended up in Aberdeen and is buried in the walls of the cathedral.

At the end of the thirteenth century Bishop Henry Cheyne decided to extend the church, but the work was interrupted by the Scottish Wars of Independence. Cheyne's progress included piers for an extended choir at the transept crossing. These pillars, with decorated capitals of red sandstone, are still visible at the east end of the present church. Though worn by exposure to the elements after the collapse of the cathedral's central tower, these capitals are among the finest stone carvings of their date to survive in Scotland. Bishop Alexander Kininmund II demolished the Norman cathedral in the late 14th century, and began the nave, including the granite columns and the towers at the western end. Bishop Henry Lichtoun completed the nave, the west front and the northern transept, and made a start on the central tower. Bishop Ingram Lindsay completed the roof and the paving stones in the later part of the fifteenth century. Further work was done over the next fifty years by Thomas Spens, William Elphinstone and Gavin Dunbar; Dunbar is responsible for the heraldic ceiling and the two western spires.

The chancel was demolished in 1560 during the Scottish Reformation. The bells and lead from the roof were sent to be sold in Holland, but the ship sank near Girdle Ness. The central tower and spire collapsed in 1688, in a storm, and this destroyed the choir and transepts. The west arch of the crossing was then filled in, and worship carried on in the nave only; the current church consists only of the nave and aisles of the earlier building.

The ruined transepts and crossing are under the care of Historic Environment Scotland, and contain an important group of late medieval bishops' tombs, protected from the weather by modern canopies. The cathedral is chiefly built of outlayer granite. On the unique flat panelled ceiling of the nave (first half of the 16th century) are the heraldic shields of the contemporary kings of Europe, and the chief earls and bishops of Scotland.

The cathedral is an example of a fortified kirk, with twin towers, believed to have been inspired by the central tower of Perth's St John's Kirk, built in the fashion of fourteenth-century tower houses. Their walls have the strength to hold spiral staircases to the upper floors and battlements. The spires which presently crown the towers were added in the 15th century. Bishops Gavin Dunbar and Alexander Galloway built the western towers and installed the heraldic ceiling.

Notable figures buried in the cathedral cemetery include the author J.J. Bell, Robert Brough, Gavin Dunbar, Robert Laws, a missionary to Malawi and William Ogilvie of Pittensear—the ‘rebel professor’.

St Machar's kirk has been featured by BBC TV's Songs of Praise.

Ministry 
The minister from 2004 to 2011 was the Reverend Dr Alan D. Falconer, who previously worked with the Secretariat of the World Council of Churches in Geneva.
In 2011 the Reverend Jane Barron became the first female minister of St Machar's Cathedral. She was formerly minister at St Andrew's Church, Jerusalem and Stobswell Parish Church, Dundee. In 2015 Rev Barry Dunsmore became minister of St Machar's Cathedral.

Notable past ministers include:

James Lawson first Presbyterian minister 1569 to 1572 – translated to St Giles in Edinburgh to replace John Knox, Moderator in 1580
Alexander Arbuthnot from 1574 to 1596 – also Principal of King's College, Aberdeen, Moderator in 1573 and 1577
David Rait 1598 to 1632, Moderator of Synod and Moderator of the Aberdeen General Assembly of 1605
Alexander Scrogie 1621 to 1640
William Strachan 1640 to 1653
John Seaton 1656 to 1662
Alexander Scrogie (secundus) 1659 to 1661
Alexander Middleton 1661 to 1665 became Principal of King's College, Aberdeen
Robert Reynold 1665 to 1670 also Rector of King's College, Aberdeen
George Strachan (son of William) 1672 to 1678
George Chalmers 1729 to 1745 also Principal of King's College, Aberdeen
Patrick Forbes second charge 1816 to 1847, Moderator in 1829

Conservation and restoration 
There has been considerable investment in recent years in restoration work and the improvement of the display of historic artefacts at the cathedral. The battlements of the western towers, incomplete for several centuries, have been renewed to their original height and design, greatly improving the appearance of the exterior. Meanwhile, within the building, a number of important stone monuments have been displayed to advantage. These include a possibly 7th–8th-century cross-slab from Seaton (the only surviving evidence from Aberdeen of Christianity at such an early date); a rare 12th century sanctuary cross-head; and several well-preserved late medieval effigies of cathedral clergy, valuable for their detailed representation of contemporary dress. A notable modern addition to the cathedral's artistic treasures is a carved wooden triptych commemorating John Barbour, archdeacon of Aberdeen (d. 1395), author of The Brus.

In 1987, bells from the deconsecrated St Stephen's Church, Ealing were restored by Eayre & Smith and installed in St Machar's. It is now one of the few churches in Scotland to have a set of bells designed for change ringing.

In 2020 the cathedral embarked on a £1.85m project to re-slate the roof, clean the heraldic ceiling, and repair some of the stained glass windows. Work, which was delayed by Covid-19 began mid-year and is expected to take until the end of 2020.

Stained Glass

Scots law and religious convention only allowed the re-introduction of stained glass in 1866 and there were no manufacturers then to fill the skills gap so the earliest windows are of English creation.

The range and quality of stained glass in St Machar's is exceptional.

 Main west window, by Clayton and Bell 1870 – a set of seven narrow linear windows
 Main east window, by William Wilson 1953 – flanked by small windows by Daniel Cottier from 1870s
 North aisle, window 1 – by Marjorie Kemp 1920s – Parable of the Talents
 North aisle, window 2 – by Marjorie Kemp 1920s – Nativity as memorial to James W. H. Trail
 North aisle, window 3 – by Margaret Chilton 1920s – Dorcas window 
 North aisle, window 4 – by Margaret Chilton 1920s – Serpent and the Crucifixion
 North aisle, window 5 – by Margaret Chilton 1920s – memorial to Marshall Gilchrist, organist
 North aisle, window 7 – by Daniel Cottier 1870s – Memorial to James Jameson and James Auldjo Jameson
 South aisle, window 1 – by Daniel Cottier 1870s
 South aisle, window 2 – by Daniel Cottier 1870s – Faith Hope and Charity: A memorial to George Jamesone, John Philip and William Dyce
 South aisle, window 3 – by Douglas Strachan 1913 – the Bishops Window
 South aisle, window 4 – by Clayton and Bell 1877 – as a memorial to Robert Smith DD
 South aisle, window 5 – by Douglas Strachan 1924 – as a war memorial, depicting St Michael and the dragon over Aberdeen Bay
 South aisle, window 6 – by Douglas Strachan 1908 – the Crombie window

Ceiling 

The heraldic ceiling features 48 coats of arms in three rows of sixteen. Among those shown are:
 Pope Leo X's coat of arms in the centre, followed in order of importance by those of the Scottish archbishops and bishops.
 the Prior of St Andrews, representing other Church orders.
 King's College, the westernmost shield.
 Henry VIII of England, James V of Scotland and multiple instances for the Holy Roman Emperor Charles V, who was also King of Spain, Aragon, Navarre and Sicily at the time the ceiling was created.
 St Margaret of Scotland, possibly as a stand-in for Margaret Tudor, James V's mother, whose own arms would have been the marshalled arms of England and Scotland.  
 the arms of Aberdeen and of the families Gordon, Lindsay, Hay and Keith.

The ceiling is set off by a frieze which starts at the north-west corner of the nave and lists the bishops of the see from Nechtan in 1131 to William Gordon at the Reformation in 1560. This is followed by the Scottish monarchs from Máel Coluim II to Mary, Queen of Scots.

Internal burials 

William Wallace, Bishop of Culter Railway (1422–1440)
William de Deyn, Bishop of Aberdeen (1344–1350)
John de Rait, Bishop of Aberdeen (1350–1355)
Alexander de Kininmund, Bishop of Aberdeen (1355–1380)
Henry de Lichton, Bishop of Aberdeen (1422–1440)
Gavin Dunbar (Bishop of Aberdeen), 1518/9–32
William Stewart (bishop of Aberdeen), 1532–1545
William Gordon (bishop), Bishop of Aberdeen (1545–1577)
Patrick Forbes, Bishop of Aberdeen (1618–1635)
David Mitchel, Bishop of Aberdeen (1662–1663)
Patrick Scougal, Bishop of Aberdeen (1664–1682)

External Burials

Sir Harvey Adamson
James Barron (harbour engineer)
John Joy Bell author
Robert Brough artist
Very Rev Prof Peter Colin Campbell
James Edward Crombie philanthropist
John William Crombie MP
George Dickie (botanist)
Very Rev Patrick Forbes
Sir William Hamilton Fyfe (memorial only)
Rev George Garden
William Duguid Geddes
Very Rev Alexander Gerard
James Giles RSA
David Gill (astronomer)
Prof John Harrower
Jessie Seymour Irvine, hymn tune composer
Rev Prof William Jack principal of King's College
Very Rev John Marshall Lang
James Leatham social reformer and author
Bishop Henry Leighton
William Leslie of Nethermuir (1802–1879) Lord Provost of Aberdeen
John Lumsden
Hector Munro MacDonald
Very Rev Prof Roderick MacLeod (within the east enclosure)
Rev Prof Duncan Mearns
George Pirie (mathematician)
Very Rev William Robinson Pirie
Prof Hercules Scott
James Augustus Sinclair, 16th Earl of Caithness
Prof David Thomson (physicist)
Lt General William Montgomerie Thomson (memorial only)
Philip Tidyman
Prof James W. H. Trail
Very Rev Samuel Trail

See also 
 List of Church of Scotland parishes
 University of Aberdeen
 Bede House, Old Aberdeen
 Ray McAleese, Bishop Gavin Dunbar: Nobleman, Statesman, Catholic Bishop, Administrator and Philanthropist. ed. by Walter R. H. Duncan, Friends of St Machar, Occasional Publications, Series 2, No. 7 (Aberdeen: Friends of St Machar, 2013), p. 40.

References

External links 

 St Machar's Cathedral website

 
Category A listed buildings in Aberdeen
Listed cathedrals in Scotland
Medieval cathedrals in Scotland
Cathedrals of the Church of Scotland
 
Tourist attractions in Aberdeenshire